John Dudley Charlesworth (October 13, 1902 – September 28, 1962) was an American football player.  

Charlesworth enrolled at Yale University and, while there, played on the Yale Bulldogs football team in 1925 and 1927. He was a consensus choice for the 1927 College Football All-America Team. 

Charlesworth graduated from Yale in 1929.  He was married and had a son, John D. Charlesworth, Jr.  He worked as a sales executive at the Shatz Painting Company in Manhattan.  In September 1962, he died from a heart attack at his home on East 77th Street after returning home from eating out.

References

1902 births
1962 deaths
American football centers
Yale Bulldogs football players
All-American college football players
Sportspeople from Berkshire County, Massachusetts
Players of American football from Massachusetts
Clarksburg, Massachusetts